Wolfgang Kreißig (born 29 August 1970 in Gehrden, West Germany) is a retired German track and field athlete who specialised in the high jump. He was a finalist at both 1996 and 2000 Summer Olympics, finishing ninth and eighth respectively. His best placing on the global stage was fifth at the 1997 IAAF World Indoor Championships.

He has personal bests of 2.34 metres outdoors (1999) and 2.30 metres indoors (1997). He was a member of the MTG Mannheim sports club.

Competition record

References

External links

1970 births
Living people
German male high jumpers
Athletes (track and field) at the 1996 Summer Olympics
Athletes (track and field) at the 2000 Summer Olympics
Olympic athletes of Germany
Universiade medalists in athletics (track and field)
People from Gehrden
Universiade silver medalists for Germany
MTG Mannheim athletes
Sportspeople from Lower Saxony